CenturyTel of Central Indiana, Inc., is a telephone operating of CenturyLink providing local telephone services to the communities of Brookston, Battle Ground, and Kempton in Indiana. The company was founded in 1954 as the Central Indiana Telephone Company Incorporated, later changing its name to Century Telephone of Central Indiana, Inc., in 1996, and then to its current name in 1998.

The company has been owned by CenturyLink, which was formerly CenturyTel.

Lumen Technologies
Telecommunications companies established in 1954
1954 establishments in Indiana